Religion in America or American religion may refer to:

Religions
Religion in North America
Religion in the United States of America
American civil religion, a  sociological theory that   a nonsectarian quasi-religious faith exists within the United States with sacred symbols drawn from national history
Native American religions, the spiritual practices of the Native Americans in the United States
Mesoamerican religion, a group of indigenous religions of Mesoamerica that were prevalent in the pre-Columbian era
Religion in Latin America
Religion in Central America
Religion in South America
African diaspora religions (or Afro-American religions), a number of related religions that developed in the Americas in various nations of the Caribbean, Latin America and the Southern United States

Books
Encyclopedia of American Religions, a reference book by J. Gordon Melton first published in 1978
The American Religion, (1992; second edition 2006) is a book by literary critic Harold Bloom